Helechawa is an unincorporated community in Wolfe County, Kentucky, United States.

The town of Helechawa was established in 1901 along the route of the Ohio and Kentucky Railroad. The president of the railway coined the name from that of his daughter, Helen Chase Walbridge. Its post office  has since closed.

References

Unincorporated communities in Wolfe County, Kentucky
Unincorporated communities in Kentucky